Artemio Rocamora (born June 29, 1934) is a Filipino weightlifter. He competed in the men's light heavyweight event at the 1964 Summer Olympics.

References

External links
 

1934 births
Living people
Filipino male weightlifters
Olympic weightlifters of the Philippines
Weightlifters at the 1964 Summer Olympics
Place of birth missing (living people)
20th-century Filipino people